Sethu is a 1999 Indian Tamil-language romantic drama film, written and directed by Bala. The film stars Vikram and Abitha in lead roles. The score and soundtrack was composed by Ilaiyaraaja.

The film was initially released in a single suburban theatre in October 1999, but was released later on 10 December 1999 in theatres across Tamil Nadu. It became Vikram's first major breakthrough film. Sethu won the National Film Award for Best Feature Film in Tamil, and the Best Film category at the Filmfare Awards and the Cinema Express Awards. Bala and Vikram also won several awards for their contributions to the film. The film was remade in Kannada as Huchcha, in Telugu as Seshu, in Hindi as Tere Naam, in Odia as Rakate Lekhichi Na (2003) and in Bangladesh as Tor Karone Beche Achi.

Plot 

Sethu, aka Chiyaan, is a rough and macho college student, and the Chairman of the college's Student Union. He deals with people violently and has a bad temper. He lives with his older brother Vasudevan, a court magistrate, and has a troubled relationship with him. His sister-in-law seems to be the only person who understands him.

The movie begins with Sethu winning the Chair of the Students' Union election, followed by celebrations and an on-campus fight between the rival candidates. Sethu is shown to be aggressive and temperamental. He also has an entourage of loyal friends and a strange vagabond lunatic girl who follows around their group. The next day, Sethu and Vasudevan argue over his apparent rowdyism at college, and Sethu storms out of the house. While catching up with his friends at the college entrance, he spots a timid Brahmin girl, Abitha, making her way into the college. He calls her out and mercilessly rags her for fun by asking trivial questions. However, Abitha's innocent nature and soft-spoken responses win his tough exterior and he begins to like her. Unknowingly after the ragging, Abitha drops a peacock feather from her book, which Sethu keeps. He also bumps into her at the temple during his birthday prayers which leads to some lighthearted interaction between the two. Slowly but gradually, Sethu finds himself falling in love with Abitha. His sister-in-law and friends also notice some subtle good changes in him as well. He also begins to admire the peacock feather to remember Abitha. Sethu also helps her by using his college chairman powers to let her sit for an exam entrance for which she was earlier denied.

Concurrently, Abitha's sister returns home in a pitiful state citing dowry-related torture by her husband. She is determined to annul her marriage and stay at home with her child. She unsuccessfully asks a few people for a loan to repay her dowry. Meanwhile, Sethu awkwardly expresses his love to Abitha. However, Abitha is surprised by the proposal as she never had any feelings for him. In a fit of disbelief, she is unable to react properly when Sethu asks if she loves him and Sethu assumes that she reciprocates his love. He also learns of Abitha's would-be fiancé. Displaying a possessive nature, he threatens the fiancé, who is a passive mannered priest, to back off from Abitha. Frightful, the priest complies.

Subsequently, Abitha openly rejects Sethu when he attempts to present her a gift while catching up with her in a college science lab. She also explains to him that she never had any romantic interest in him. Unable to digest the truth, Sethu aggressively and angrily questions Abitha, causing her to scold him off. Feeling dejected, Sethu spends the night drinking with his friends, who advise him to shed his rowdy image and instead be more timid in front of her to earn his chances back. The next morning, one of Sethu's friends gets thrashed by his rival in college, and Sethu attacks the rival up in retaliation. He continues to throw punches, until he catches the sight of Abitha, who has witnessed the ordeal at the corner. He immediately stops and walks away, feeling a sense of powerlessness to her. His friends, noticing the profound change in him, question him about his loyalties to friendship over his love. They argue in the midst, and one of his friend passes a crude remark about Abitha, causing Sethu to fight him in anger. Realizing that his love is causing him to act rashly, Sethu apologizes to his friends and they patch up. However, he still feels heartbroken over Abitha and continues his days thinking about her.

At this point, Sethu is informed by his friend of a brothel racket whose patron had misbehaved with the former's sister outside the brothel. He wastes no time and busts their operations, while beating out the brothel owners and also informing the police. While searching the brothel rooms, he coincidentally bumps into a woman, unaware that she is Abitha's sister. Initially mistaking her for a prostitute, Sethu is scornful towards her. Feeling confused and angered by his remarks, Abitha's sister argues back, explaining to him on her arrangement to collect her dowry loan at the premise. Sethu then soon realizes that she is an innocent woman who has been conned into prostitution without her knowledge and learns of her dowry-related torture. While the police arrests the brothel owners and prostitutes, Sethu rescues her discretely from the place by covering her with his jacket and brings her to his bike. Ironically, he also catches sight of Abitha who is amongst the crowd, outside witnessing the police arrest. Abitha also sees him with the covered woman thinking that its a brothel worker, completely unaware that its her sister. Though awkward, Sethu takes off with his bike with the woman seated behind him. Dropping her to safety, Sethu enquires Abitha's sister about her husband's whereabouts. Breaking down, Abitha's sister thanks him for the merciful help and informs Sethu, who then goes off into the night. Meanwhile, Abitha's fiance has witnessed the entire incident, realizing the grave help Sethu had just done in rescuing her.

The next day, Sethu travels to the Sub-registrar office and thrashes Abitha's sister's husband. He threatens him to accept his wife back. Learning his lesson, the husband reunites with Abitha's sister. The family feels blissful over the dispute resolution and a joyous Abitha prays at the temple for the good turn of events. However, her fiancé recaps to Abitha and explains Sethu's role on that fateful night her sister was rescued from the brothel. He also explains that Sethu, though rough, is altruistic with a moral compass. He also reminds Abitha that his own profession as a priest would not sustain her married life with him. Acknowledging that he has a heart of gold, Abitha realizes Sethu's feelings. However, Sethu acts rashfully and kidnaps Abitha to an abandoned building. In there, he painfully expresses his love and feelings while also berating her for not understanding him. Its a marked change from the usual Sethu that Abitha has seen. Realizing the extent of his love, Abitha finally succumbs to his love. His love finally succeeded, Sethu is ecstatic and daydreams lying on his motorbike until he is suddenly punched in his face..

Just when things seem to have worked well for him, Sethu is viciously attacked by the brothel goons who seek revenge for busting their prostitute racket. Several goons join in and take turns to violently assault him. Sethu is completely overpowered in the fight and is crippled. While he is knocked out to the ground, they drag his body and brutally hit his head into a rock, bloodying it. The severe impact lacerates a part of his brain and it gets torn with critical damage and internal wounds, making him go traumatic and lose his sanity. They then throw his body on a cliff, leaving him in a gory and a disturbing condition.

Sethu is admitted in a mental hospital, where his case is considered hopeless for recovery. The doctors recommend his worried family and friends for Sethu to be sent to a mental asylum at a temple in Yerwadi ashram, where the ayurvedic therapeutic treatment might prove a chance to cure him. 
Sethu's life is completely flipped upside down as his condition has made him a mental patient, unable to comprehend anything. He is sent to the Yerwadi ashram, where conditions are rather inhumane. He becomes thin and is shaved bald, wearing a tattered shirt and shorts in the ashram. He is also chained to the walls like other mentally ill patients. He undergoes intense treatment at the temple. Meanwhile, Abitha is worried for him as she had yet to hear from him since his injury. Eventually, Sethu's brain heals from its wounds and he recovers back to normal. He tries to persuade the ashram authorities and Swamiji that he is fully recovered and can be released. However, his cries fall on deaf ears and the wardens beat him up. A desperate Sethu attempts to escape from the ashram by climbing over the gates, but he falls unto the sharp points of the gate and obtains serious injuries. At the same time, Abitha is being pressured to marry her fiancé. She is also unable to sacrifice her love for Sethu.

Whilst Sethu is sleeping, Abitha pays him a surprise visit and is distraught to see him in such a condition. As she is about to leave the institution, he wakes up and realizes she had come to see him. He calls out, but she leaves unable to hear him as his shouts are drowned by the noises. Determined to meet her, he makes another attempt to escape the institution and this time is successful. His legs still chained and his shirt dirty, he limps his way to Abi's house. When he arrives at her house, he finds marriage decorations at her place. Confused, he limps inside to the house and notices a crowd gathered at the center. Glancing over, he finally sees Abitha lying on the ground with garlands on her neck with people mourning her: she has killed herself.

Heartbroken, Sethu realizes that his efforts have amounted to nothing. Distraught, he steps outs of the house and limps away. His friends and family run over to see him full of tears, but Sethu does not respond nor see them and keeps limping until the ashram wardens come with their van. He has one final last look and walks in to the van. The film ends with Sethu leaving with them as he has nothing left to live for after his true love's death.

Cast 

 Vikram as Sethu
 Abitha as Abitha Kujalambal (voice dubbed by Savitha Reddy)
 Sivakumar as Vasudevan
 Sriman as Das
 Anju Mahendra as Sethu's friend
 Sriram as Sriram
 Vijaya Bharathi (aka Bharathi) as Latha
 Lavanya as Kamakshi, Abitha's sister
 Rasheed Ummer as Abitha's brother-in-law
 Mohan Vaithya as Abitha's uncle
 Manobala as Tamil Teacher
 Rajashree as Raji
 Hemalatha as Vasudevan's daughter
 Kavitha Tinku as Abitha's friend
 S. S. Raman as Abitha's father
 Jyothi Lakshmi as the old lady dancer in "Gaana Karunkuyile" song
 Sasikumar as a college student (uncredited role)
Ameer as a college student (uncredited role)

 Anwar alikhan as (Brothel goon)

Production

Development 

Bala, an assistant of Balu Mahendra, wrote the script of the film in the mid-1990s, which was then titled Akilan. Based on the film on a real-life incident of one of his friends named Mohammed Honest, a classmate of Bala in American college of Madhurai, who had fallen in love, lost his mind and ended up at a mental asylum. Certain portions of the film were actual incidents that occurred in his friend's life such as the brothel rescue. Bala also shared that the film is a tribute to his friend. The film also has been censored on the violent sequence of Sethu getting brain damaged with the theatrical version showing blood splattering onto the rock when his head is hit onto it,while the home-media versions and DVD releases do not show this. On close observation, the blood on the rock has been digitally removed. In some TV broadcasts, this sequence was omitted due to the violence. In some behind-the-scenes interview, the original film had Sethu being banged on the head multiple times before being thrown on top of the rock. Also this film had a similarities of Malayalam Novel Iruttinte Athmavu (1967), written by M. T. Vasudevan Nair

Casting 
Bala first offered the film's lead role to his housemate Vignesh, who did not accept. He then offered the lead role to actor J. D. Chakravarthy who liked the script but was unable to sign the film as he was busy with another project. Murali was then also considered for the lead role in the project, but did not sign up. Finally in 1997, Bala gave the role of Sethu to his friend, then struggling actor Vikram. Keerthi Reddy was initially signed on to play the lead female role, but was later replaced by Rajshri and then subsequently Abitha.

To prepare for the character, Vikram shaved his head, thinned down to half his size by losing 21 kilograms and grew out his nails and even exposed himself under the sun for hours for skin darkening as the script demanded it. Vikram lived off fruit juice for six months, and once he lost the desired weight, he maintained the look by subsisting on a scanty diet: an egg white, one glass of beetroot or carrot juice and a single dry chapatti through the day.

Bala did not want Vikram to accept any other offers during this period to maintain the continuity of his looks and asked him to cease working as a dubbing artist. The film's launch was held in April 1997, and production lasted close to two years as the film languished in development hell. The FEFSI strike of 1997 halted filming across the Tamil film industry from June to December 1997, and as a small budget film, Sethu was unable to progress during the period.

Filming 
When the strike was called off, the producer left the project and Vikram and Bala's assistant, Ameer, pled with the producer to return, with filming resuming in January 1998.

After further slow progression, the film was finally completed in June 1999. M. S. Bhaskar lent his voice for S. S. Raman who appeared as a temple priest in this film. Rathnavelu, who worked as a cameraman, said he gave the asylum scenes a predominantly green tone for the intense psychological impact. Vikram has described the period of production as "the worst phase of his career", as he was weak economically, and "his fire was in danger of dying down".

Release 
The film struggled to find a distributor and only after sixty-seven screenings did the film manage to find a buyer, with most refusing the film due to its tragic climax. At that time, Bala and Vikram used money from Vikram's wife, Shailaja, to organize press previews. Despite garnering good reviews, no one was interested in purchasing the film and it remained finished but unreleased. Made on a shoestring budget, Sethu was a sleeper hit grossing almost 4 crore ($560,000) at the box office. The film was released on 10 December 1999, and initially began running at a single noon show in a suburban theatre, but gradually built up audiences through word-of-mouth publicity. The film ran over 100 days at several cinema halls across Chennai, with Vikram being mobbed by people on the streets as a result of the film's success. Critics lapped up Vikram's performance with the reviewer Easwaran Haricharan of Indolink stating, "Vikram is a revelation". Similarly, a critic from the New Straits Times described the film as an "unforgettable experience" and described Vikram's performance as "praise-worthy".

Accolades 
The following year, Sethu won the National Film Award for Best Feature Film in Tamil, while also securing wins in the Best Film category at the Filmfare Awards and the Cinema Express Awards. Bala won the Tamil Nadu State Film Award for Best Director and the Filmfare Award for Best Director – Tamil for his directorial debut. The performance also drew accolades for Vikram who won the Filmfare Special Award – South and the Tamil Nadu State Film Award Special Prize for his portrayal of the title character, he was nominated for the National Film Award for Best Actor but lost to Mohanlal. Post-success, Vikram has said the film would have been close to him regardless of the commercial success, and it put him on the "right path", with Vikram choosing to adopt the prefix of Chiyaan to his screen name. Owing to its success, the film was remade in Kannada as Huchcha, in Telugu as Seshu and in Hindi as Tere Naam.

Legacy 
The film was a milestone in the career of Vikram. The success of the film made Bala one of the most sought after directors in the industry. The film continued the trend of films with themes that focused on realism and nativity. K. Jeshi, a journalist for The Hindu, placed it in the category of films which propagates social issues, like Kaadhal (2004), Veyil (2006), Mozhi (2007) and Paruthiveeran (2007).

Parodies 
Sethu was parodied in various films. In a comedy scene from Alli Thandha Vaanam (2001), Vivek, who acted as a Tamil teacher, would lie in a similar way as Vikram while the song "Enge Sellum Indha Paadhai" played in the background. The scene where Vikram kidnaps and threatens Abitha to accept his love was imitated by Vadivelu in Style (2002). In Ragasiyamai (2003), Karunas who appears as a barber, shows a customer (who asked for the same hairstyle of Kuruthipunal Kamal) another of his customers is lying in a position similar to Vikram from Sethu. In the late 2003 released Thirumalai, Vijay sings the song "Enge Sellum Indha Paadhai" while visiting Jyothika at a yoga ashram.

Soundtrack 
The soundtrack album and background score were composed by Ilaiyaraaja. The lyrics were written by Mu. Metha, Ponnadiyan, Arivumathi, Palani Bharathi, and Ilaiyaraaja.

References

External links 
 

1999 romantic drama films
1990s Tamil-language films
1999 films
Best Tamil Feature Film National Film Award winners
Films about amnesia
Films directed by Bala (director)
Indian romantic drama films
Films scored by Ilaiyaraaja
Tamil films remade in other languages
1999 directorial debut films